"(You Make Me) Rock Hard" is a song by the American rock band Kiss from their 1988 greatest hits album Smashes, Thrashes & Hits. The song is the album's second track and was released as its second single.

Background and writing 
"(You Make Me) Rock Hard" is one of two new songs on the Kiss greatest hits album Smashes, Thrashes & Hits released in 1988, the other being "Let's Put the X in Sex". Both songs are about sex.

The song was written by Paul Stanley, Desmond Child and Diane Warren.

It was recorded by Paul Stanley on his own in July 1988 at New York's Right Track Studios. According to The Official Price Guide to Kiss Collectibles by Ingo Floren, "Let's Put the X in Sex" and "(You Make Me) Rock Hard" "let some fans wonder about the new musical direction of the band" because they "were produced with lots of keyboards over a dance-orientated beat".

The song was released in the United States as a cassette single in December 1988.

Music video
Howard Johnson writing for Classic Rock ranked the song's video at No. 8 on their list of The Top 10 Best Hair Metal Videos.

Personnel 
Paul Stanley – vocals, rhythm guitar, bass
Bruce Kulick – lead guitar, backing vocals
Eric Carr – drums, percussion, backing vocals
Phil Ashley – keyboards

References

External links 
 "(You Make Me) Rock Hard" at Discogs
 

1988 songs
1989 singles
Kiss (band) songs
Mercury Records singles
Songs written by Paul Stanley
Songs written by Desmond Child
Songs written by Diane Warren